Paramyristica is a monotypic genus of flowering plants belonging to the family Myristicaceae. The only species is Paramyristica sepicana.

Its native range is New Guinea.

References

Myristicaceae
Myristicaceae genera
Monotypic magnoliid genera